Sverre Harrfeldt (born November 23, 1937, Oslo) is a former Norwegian speedway rider.  He came second in the 1966 World championships beaten in race 9 by Barry Briggs the eventual champion.  He rode for club sides West Ham, Wimbledon and Wembley.

World Final Appearances

Individual World Championship
 1963 -  London, Wembley Stadium - 6th - 10pts
 1966 -  Göteborg, Ullevi - 2nd - 14pts

References

Norwegian speedway riders
1937 births
Living people
Sportspeople from Oslo
West Ham Hammers riders
Wembley Lions riders
Wimbledon Dons riders